China Securities Index Company (Chinese: 中证指数有限公司)  is a Chinese financial research firm and index provider. The company was founded in August 25, 2005 as a joint venture between the Shanghai Stock Exchange and the Shenzhen Stock Exchange. CSI is an index provider in China and manages over 4,000 indexes. The company also offers bond valuation and credit rating services. As of 2020, CSI has 138 employees.

While CSI indexes only cover Chinese securities, they are heavily used by investors worldwide. Multiple investment products including exchange-traded products use CSI indexes as their benchmarks, including the KraneShares CSI China Internet ETF and Direxion Daily China A Share ETFs.

Notable Indexes 

 The CSI 100 Index
 The CSI 200 Index
 The CSI 300 Index
 The CSI 500 Index
 The CSI Overseas China Internet Index

Notable ETFs linked to CSI indexes

References 

Chinese companies established in 2005
Financial services companies of China